Sazeman-e Enqelab (also Romanized as Sāzemān-e Enqelāb and Sāzmān-e Enqelāb; also known as Ja‘farbāy) is a village in Mazraeh-ye Shomali Rural District, Voshmgir District, Aqqala County, Golestan Province, Iran. At the 2006 census, its population was 1,306, in 238 families.

References 

Populated places in Aqqala County